Heshmatabad (also Romanized as Ḩeshmatābād and Hashmatābād) is a village in Mian Rokh Rural District, Jolgeh Rokh District, Torbat-e Heydarieh County, Razavi Khorasan Province, Iran. At the 2006 census, its population was 537, in 131 families.

References 

Populated places in Torbat-e Heydarieh County